Apona is a genus of moths in the family Eupterotidae.

Species
 Apona caschmirensis Kollar, 1844
 Apona frater Rothschild, 1917
 Apona fuliginosa Kishida, 1993
 Apona ligustri Mell, 1929
 Apona mandarina Leech, 1898
 Apona plumosa Moore, 1872
 Apona ronaldi Bethune-Baker, 1927
 Apona shevaroyensis Moore, 1884
 Apona yunnanensis Mell, 1929

Status unknown
 Apona chasiana Swinhoe

Former species
 Apona styx Bethune-Baker, 1908

References

 
 
 , 1993: A new species of Eupterotidae from Taiwan (Lepidoptera). Tyô to Ga, 44 (1): 25-27. Abstract and full article: .
 , 1856. List Specimens Lepid. Insects Colln. Br. Mus., 7 : 1762

Eupterotinae
Macrolepidoptera genera